Alexis Castro (born 18 October 1994) is an Argentine professional footballer who plays as a midfielder for Tigre in the Argentine Primera División.

Career
Born in Buenos Aires, Castro started his career with Club Atlético Tigre in 2011. He made his professional debut for the club on 30 March 2015 against Defensa y Justicia. He started the match and played 75 minutes as the match ended 0–0. Castro scored his first goals on 7 March 2016, scoring a hattrick against Atlético Tucumán. His hattrick helped Tigre win 5–0.

Career statistics

References

External links 
 AFA Profile.

1994 births
Living people
Argentine footballers
Argentine expatriate footballers
Association football midfielders
Footballers from Buenos Aires
Club Atlético Tigre footballers
San Lorenzo de Almagro footballers
Defensa y Justicia footballers
Club Tijuana footballers
Club Atlético Colón footballers
Argentine Primera División players
Argentine expatriate sportspeople in Mexico
Expatriate footballers in Mexico